"Too Much" is a song performed by American contemporary R&B singer Tara Kemp, issued as the third and final single from her eponymous debut album. It was her most recent single to chart on the Billboard Hot 100, peaking at #95 in 1991.

Chart positions

References

External links
 
 

1990 songs
1991 singles
Giant Records (Warner) singles
Tara Kemp songs